Extranjera ("(Female) Foreigner") is the debut solo album by Mexican singer Dulce María. Extranjera was divided into two EPs, starting with Extranjera Primera Parte, containing seven songs, released on November 9, 2010. and Extranjera Segunda Parte released on June 14, 2011, with 7 more tracks plus a DVD with extras. The first single off the album was "Inevitable".

Singles 
"Inevitable" was released as the lead single from the album released on May 11, 2010. The music video for the song premiered on May 24, 2010.

"Ya No" was chosen as the second single off Extranjera, and was released to radios on November 16, 2010. "Ya No" is a cover from the late singer Selena off her Amor Prohibido album. Due to piracy issues the music video for "Ya No" was released on February 10, 2011. .

"Ingenua" was released as the album's third single.

Track listing

Promotion 

Extranjera On Tour was the tour staged in support of the album. The tour began in Puebla, Mexico on April 15, 2011 and wrapped up in Caracas, Venezuela on September 23, 2011.

Setlist 
 Intro
 Luna
 Irremediablemente
 Vacaciones
 No Se Parece
 Medley: Déjame Ser, Mas Tuya Que Mia, Lagrimas Perdidas
 Extranjera
 Medley RBD I: Inalcanzable, Aún Hay Algo, Sólo Quédate En Silencio
 24/7
 El Verano
 Pensando En Ti
 Te Daria Todo
 ¿Quién Serás?
 Ingenua
 Medley RBD II: Tenerte y Quererte, Otro Día Que Vá, Me Voy, Celestial
 No Pares
 Inevitable
 Ya No

Charts and certifications

Year-end charts

Certifications and sales

References

2010 debut EPs
2011 debut albums
Albums produced by A.B. Quintanilla
Universal Music Latino EPs
Spanish-language EPs
Albums produced by Sebastian Krys
Dulce María albums